The Elgé was a French automobile manufactured from 1924 until 1925.  Created at Bordeaux by Roger Louis Maleyre, a pioneer in the field of aerodynamics, it was very low and light, and was well streamlined; the cars used CIM engines.  Maleyre also produced a prototype design for a propeller-driven car which was never put into production.  In total about thirty cars were produced.

References

David Burgess Wise, The New Illustrated Encyclopedia of Automobiles.

Defunct motor vehicle manufacturers of France
Companies based in Bordeaux